The 2001 Missouri Valley Conference men's basketball tournament was played in St. Louis, Missouri at the conclusion of the 2000–2001 regular season.

Tournament Bracket

See also
 Missouri Valley Conference

References

2000–01 Missouri Valley Conference men's basketball season
Missouri Valley Conference men's basketball tournament